Anders Hunstad  (born 3 February 1974) is a Norwegian musician and songwriter from Oslo.

Discography 
 1996 – Ravana "Common Daze"
 1999 – Prosessor Balthazar "Riot 99"
 2000 – Autopulver "Vapor Trails"
 2002 – Morris "Ingen ringere enn..."
 2003 – The Landlords "Meant to be"
 2003 – El Caco "The Search"
 2005 – Surferosa "The Force"
 2006 – Bermuda Triangle "33rpm"
 2006 – One People "Love is forever (The Indigenous Soul)"
 2006 – One People "Tatanka"
 2007 – Tulus "Biography Obscene"
 2007 – Tvang "En ny morgen"
 2007 – One People "In The Beginning Was Love (The Indigenous Soul)
 2008 – Plywood "Vitesse"
 2009 – Sarke "Vorunah"
 2009 – Meanderthals "Desire Lines"
 2009 – Tvang "Unik"
 2009 – Bermuda Triangle "Love Computer City"
2009 – El Caco "Heat"
2010 – Sarah Jo "Inner child, the wise & me vol. 1"
 2011 – Sarke "Oldarhian"
 2011 – SOT "Kind Of Saltz"
2011 – Karen Jo Field "4 Songs"
2012 – One Prayer 
 2013 – Sarke "Aruagint"
 2014 – Lonely Kamel "Shit City"
 2014 – SOT "Redwings Nest"
 2015 – Satyricon "Live at the Opera"
 2016 – Lonely Kamel "Blues for the dead"
 2017 – SOT "Kogel Mogel"
2017 – Sarke "Viige Uhr"
2019 – Sarke "Gastwerso"
 2019 – AtomHart "AtomHart EP"

Live session work 
 Satyricon (2011–present)
 Sarke (2008–present)
 Infidels Forever (2007)
 Briskeby (2005–2007)
 Morten Abel (2005–2006)
 Karen Jo Fields (2004–2007)
 Aggie Frost (2002–2006)

References

External links 
 
 
 

Norwegian musicians
Norwegian songwriters
1974 births
Living people